Kardhan is a census town in Ambala district in the Indian state of Haryana.

Demographics
 India census, Kardhan had a population of 9579. Males constitute 54% of the population and females 46%. Kardhan has an average literacy rate of 72%, higher than the national average of 59.5%: male literacy is 77%, and female literacy is 67%. In Kardhan, 13% of the population is under 6 years of age.

References

Cities and towns in Ambala district